St. Mary's College Kisubi (SMACK) is a private, boarding middle and high school located in Wakiso District in the Central Region of Uganda. Established in 1906.

Location

The coordinates of the college are 0°07'17.0"N, 32°32'00.0"E (Latitude:0.121389; Longitude:32.533333).

History

St. Mary's School was founded by Reverend Raux Modeste of the White Fathers Congregation in 1906 and was named after its patroness, Saint Mary. Today, the Catholic Archdiocese of Kampala owns St. Mary's College Kisubi (SMACK). At the beginning of 1899, the Catholic chiefs in the Buganda Kingdom, under the leadership of Chief Stanislas Mugwanya, raised
the question of higher education for Catholic youths in the kingdom. Their request was laid for consideration by the August Assembly of the White Fathers' General Chapter at Algiers in 1900. Out of those efforts, SMACK was founded.

Reputation
According to a 2018 published report, St. Mary's College Kisubi is the most prestigious school in Uganda, owing to its excellent academic performance and all round nurturing of its students. The school offers education that encourages independent thinking and development.

St. Mary's started out occupying only about 10 buildings. The oldest of them was the two-storeyed dormitory for Senior One and Two students that was later brought down and replaced by the current Chemistry Laboratory.  The administration block remains unchanged from back in the day. Standing at the centre of the college, it serves as the most centralised block on campus.

Uniform
The SMACK students from 1906 to the early 1960s wore a pair of shorts and a white shirt as their uniform. Those who could afford a pair of shoes did wear them and others stayed barefooted. With many years of development, the uniform and the badge inclusive have had to succumb to many changes in design. The students today don a white shirt with a plain navy blue tie for ordinary level students, a striped tie for the advanced level students and a pair of grey trousers. Blazers have since become mandatory for all higher school certificate students.

Lord Snowdon, in 1964, commissioned the SMACK memorial library, after the death of 12 students in a motor accident. Some of these students were part of the school football team that had gone to participate in a tournament at which they emerged victors. Cheering on the way back from the match, Milton Obote’s army suspected them to be rebels and the school lorry, which with the school bus was carrying the students, was knocked down by the army truck. In addition to the 12 deaths, an even greater number was injured that day. Today, the twelve trees planted also in memory of these students still stand tall right next to the Senior Six block.

The ever growing college, alongside its infrastructural developments, saw the introduction of a number of sports like basketball, football, swimming and hockey.

St. Mary's youngest building sits atop Kisubi hill as the tallest one yet. The new three-storied building, valued at Ugandan Shs.2.9 billion, serves as the new HSC block, replacing and outcompeting the older single-storied S5 block which stood erect since the introduction of the Higher School Certificate in SMACK in the recent past.

Alumni

The SMACK Old Boys’ Association (SMACKOBA) has been involved in the running of the school in one way or another right from its foundation in the latter half of the 20th century. Called upon in the 60s, the Old Boys took charge of the c of a circular profile, but because of cost, the current plan was taken up depicting a gallant eagle in flight. 
 
Notable alumni of St. Mary's College Kisubi (Old Smackists) include two Vice Presidents of Uganda, two Prime Ministers of Buganda Kingdom, Cabinet ministers, judges, lawyers, and distinguished academics.

Politics
 Omara Atubo – former Minister of Lands, Housing and Urban Development, 2006–2011; former member of parliament for Otuke County, 1987–2016
 Gilbert Bukenya – former vice president of Uganda, 2003 – 2011
 Henry Kajura – 2nd Deputy Prime Minister and Minister of Public Service, since 2006
 Hilary Onek – Minister of Internal Affairs, since 2011; represents for Lamwo County in the Uganda Parliament, since 2011 
 Edward Ssekandi – Vice President of Uganda since 2011
 Paul Ssemogerere – former member of parliament representing North Mengo, 1962–1966; President of the Democratic Party 1972–1986 and 2001–2005; presidential aspirant in 1986 and 1996
 Gerald Karuhanga – member of parliament representing Ntungamo municipality, 2016–2021
 Michael Mabikke – former member of parliament Makindye East and President Social Democratic Party
 William Byaruhanga – Uganda's attorney General, 2016-2021
 Matia Kasaija – current Minister of finance of Uganda
 Baguma Isoke - former minister   of Lands

Buganda Kingdom
 Charles Peter Mayiga – Katikkiro (Prime Minister) of the Kingdom of Buganda, May 2013–present
 JB Walusimbi – Former Katikkiro (Prime Minister) of the Kingdom of Buganda

Academia
 Paul D'Arbela, professor of medicine and Dean of Postgraduate studies at UMU Nkozi
 James Gita Hakim, professor of medicine, cardiologist and HIV clinical trialist
 Michael B. Nsimbi PhD, Luganda language scholar and historiographer
 Charles Olweny, Vice Chancellor UMU Nkozi
 Francis Omaswa, professor of medicine and surgery
 Dr. Alex Countinho, Executive director, Partners in health Uganda
 Gabriel Kariisa, PhD, Economist, former senior level international executive, AfDB
 John Ddumba Ssentamu, PhD Economist, former vice Chancellor Makerere University and board chairperson Centenary Bank

Writers
 Okello Oculi, novelist, poet and chronicler of African village life
 Eneriko Seruma, author and playwright
 Robert Serumaga, playwright

Civil service
 Muhoozi Kainerugaba, first son and senior presidential advisor on security
 Kale Kayihura, former Inspector General of Police 2005–2018

Businessmen/ Managers
 Francis Kitaka – founder and Chairman of Quality Industries Limited
 Frederick Kitaka – chief financial officer of Quality Chemical Industries Limited, currently the only company in Sub-Saharan Africa that manufactures triple-combination anti-retroviral drugs
 Charles Mbire – entrepreneur, businessman and industrialist; reportedly the wealthiest indigenous Ugandan; shareholder and Chairman of MTN Communications Company
 Louis Kasekende - Economist, former Deputy Governor Bank of Uganda
 Charlie Lubega - Proprietor Club Guvnor

See also
 Education in Uganda
 Wakiso District
 St. Joseph's College, Ombaci

References

Further reading
Kituuka, William Kiwanuka, A History of St. Mary's College College (1906–2006) (Kampala, St. Mary's College Kisubi Alumni, 2006 ED57224)

External links
Location of SMACK Campus at Google Maps

Boarding schools in Uganda
Educational institutions established in 1902
Boys' schools in Uganda
Wakiso District
White Fathers
1902 establishments in the British Empire
Schools in Uganda